GZO may refer to:
 Gazole railway station, in West Bengal, India
 Generation of the Future of Austria, the youth wing of the Alliance for the Future of Austria
 Nusatupe Airport, in the Solomon Islands